International School of Management GmbH (ISM) is a German business school headquartered in Dortmund. It is a private university with state recognition.

Overview 
The International School of Management (ISM) is a private, state-recognized University of Applied Sciences that has been offering career focused management education programs with an international orientation.

ISM has seven campuses in Dortmund, Frankfurt am Main, Munich, Hamburg, Cologne, Stuttgart and Berlin.

History 

Originally founded in 1990 as IDB-Wirtschaftsakademie in Dortmund by Klaus Evard, it was renamed the International School of Management (ISM) in 1992. In 1994 it was recognized as a private university of applied sciences. The company shares were taken over in 1998 by ESO Education Group.

In 2006, in accordance with the Bologna Process, ISM switched the Diploma courses to Bachelor and Master courses .

Accreditation 
ISM is recognized by the Ministry of Science of North Rhine-Westphalia, giving degrees that it issues equal status to those obtained at state universities.

In June 2004, ISM gained accreditation from the German Council of Science and Humanities for a period of ten years; this was renewed for a further 10 years in 2015.

The university first received accreditation from the FIBAA for its MBA program in 2003. Since then all ISM study programs have received FIBBA accreditation.

Ranking 
In the 2020 CHE University Ranking, ISM ranked highest for Internationality, Contact to professional practice and Support at the beginning of studies.

In the 2020 U-Multirank ranking, ISM achieved a global Top 25 score in the categories, Contact to work environment and Student mobility.

In the 2019 WirtschaftsWoche Ranking, for Business Administration, ISM came 4th in private universities and 14th overall.

Partnerships 
As of 3 September 2019, ISM is partnered with 188 universities across 43 different countries.

Notable people

Academic staff 
 Ulrich Lichtenthaler
Bert Rürup
Hermann Schubert

References

External links
 

Business schools in Germany
Universities and colleges in North Rhine-Westphalia
Private universities and colleges in Germany
1990 establishments in Germany
Educational institutions established in 1990